Arenc Palluqi (born 6 December 1997) is an Albanian professional footballer who plays as a forward for German 6th tier side SSV Kästorf.

Club career

Early career
Palluqi started his youth career at Dinamo Tirana academy in September 2011. On 4 February 2017 he moved at Adriatiku Mamurras in the Albanian First Division.

Adriatiku Mamurras
He debuted with Adriatiku Mamurras in his second match on 11 February 2017 against Burreli playing the full 90-minutes match in a 1–1 draw.

Germany
In summer 2018, Palluqi joined SSV Kästorf from fellow German amateur side FC Frittlingen.

International career
Palluqi was called up at Albania national under-19 football team by coach Arjan Bellaj for a 7 days gathering in Durrës, Albania from 29 August to 5 September 2015.

Then he was called up again for two friendly matches against Kosovo U19 on 13 & 15 October 2015. In the first match on 13 October Palluqi played as a starter in a 2–0 loss.

Career statistics

Club

References

External links
 Arenc Palluqi profile at FSHF.org
 

1997 births
Living people
Footballers from Tirana
Albanian footballers
Association football forwards
Albania youth international footballers
KF Adriatiku Mamurrasi players
Kategoria e Parë players
Albanian expatriate footballers
Expatriate footballers in Germany
Albanian expatriate sportspeople in Germany